Calvin Tolmbaye (born May 10, 1986 in Arad, Romania) is a Romanian footballer who plays for Central African Republic national team and Crișul Chișineu-Criș in the Liga III. He also holds Central African Republic citizenship.

References

External links

1986 births
Living people
Sportspeople from Arad, Romania
Romanian people of Central African Republic descent
Citizens of the Central African Republic through descent
Central African Republic people of Romanian descent
Romanian footballers
Association football central defenders
Central African Republic footballers
Central African Republic international footballers
SCM Râmnicu Vâlcea players
ACS Sticla Arieșul Turda players
FC UTA Arad players
Békéscsaba 1912 Előre footballers
Liga II players
Romanian expatriate footballers
Central African Republic expatriate footballers
Expatriate footballers in Hungary
Romanian expatriate sportspeople in Hungary
Central African Republic expatriate sportspeople in Hungary